"" ("God Bless Latvia!") is the national anthem of Latvia. Created in 1873 as a patriotic song, it did not gain official status until 1920.

History and composition 
The music and lyrics were written in 1873 by Kārlis Baumanis, a teacher who was part of the Young Latvian nationalist movement. It has been speculated that Baumanis may have borrowed part of the lyrics from a popular song that was sung to tune of "God Save the Queen", modified them and set them to music of his own. Baumanis's lyrics were different from the modern ones: he used the term "Baltics" synonymously and interchangeably with "Latvia" and "Latvians", so "Latvia" was actually mentioned only at the beginning of the first verse. Later, the term "Latvia" was removed and replaced with "Baltics" to avoid a ban on the song. This has led to the misapprehension that the term "Latvia" was not part of the song until 1920, when it was chosen as national anthem, and the word "Baltics" was replaced with "Latvia".

During the annexation of Latvia by the Soviet Union, the singing of "Dievs, svētī Latviju!" was banned. The Soviet republic of Latvia had its own anthem. "Dievs, svētī Latviju!" was restored as the state anthem of Latvia on 15 February 1990, a very short period before Latvian independence was restored on 4 May.

The anthem's tune was modernized with a new F-major version that is used since 2014; formerly, a G-major version was used on LTV's sign-on and sign-offs daily from 2011 to 2013. However, the G-major version was still played on any occasion. The current version played on LTV for their sign-on and sign-offs daily is in the key of B-flat major.

Lyrics

Other uses
 Latvian 2 euro coins bear the inscription  around the edge.

See also
 Kārlis Baumanis
 Flag of Latvia
 Coat of arms of Latvia
 Anthem of the Latvian SSR

Notes

References

External links

 The National Anthem — the website "Welcome to Latvia" has a page about the national anthem with information, sheet music, and sound files.
 Latvia: Dievs, svētī Latviju! - Audio of the national anthem of Latvia, with information and lyrics (archive link)
 Anthem sung at the Latvian Song and Dance Festival in Latvia
 Anthem pipe organ recordings of Christian hymns and sung in church

National symbols of Latvia
European anthems
Latvian music
National anthems
National anthem compositions in B-flat major
1873 songs